"B R Right" is a song recorded by American rapper Trina for her second studio album, Diamond Princess (2002). It features guest vocals from rapper Ludacris and production from rapper-producer Kanye West (prior to his mainstream breakthrough). The song was released as the third single from the album. It peaked at a moderately successful peak position of number 83 on the Billboard Hot 100, and was a Top 30 hit on the U.S. Hot Rap Tracks chart.

Music video
The music video was shot at The Diplomat Resort in Hollywood, Florida and was directed by Darren Grant.

Charts

Credits
 Mixed at Larrabee Sound Studios 
 Engineer – Ray Seay 
 Executive-Producer – Ted "Touche" Lucas, Solomon "Sox" Hepburn (Co-executive)
 Mix – Manny Maraquin
 Producer – Kanye West

Release history

References

2002 songs
Ludacris songs
Music videos directed by Darren Grant
Song recordings produced by Kanye West
Trina songs
Songs written by Ludacris
Songs written by Kanye West
Songs written by Rick Ross
Songs written by Trina
Dirty rap songs
2002 singles